Psalms II is the tenth studio album by Shane & Shane. WellHouse Records released the album on October 23, 2015. This album charted on six Billboard magazine charts, including, The Billboard 200.

Critical reception
Reviewing the album for AllMusic, Timothy Monger says, "A collection of 12 worship songs, each based on a different psalm...Mixing acoustic and folk elements with sweeping alt-rock and the duo's trademark close harmonies".

Track listing

Chart performance

References

2015 albums
Shane & Shane albums